The Able rocket stage was a rocket stage manufactured in the United States by Aerojet as the second of three stages of the Vanguard rocket used in the Vanguard project from 1957 to 1959. The rocket engine used nitric acid and UDMH as rocket propellants. The Able rocket stage was discontinued in 1960. The improved Ablestar version was used as the upper stage of the Thor-Ablestar two stage launcher.  The Ablestar second stage was an enlarged version of the Able rocket stage, which gave the Thor-Ablestar a greater payload capacity compared to the earlier Thor-Able. It also incorporated restart capabilities, allowing a multiple-burn trajectory to be flown, further increasing payload, or allowing the rocket to reach different orbits. It was the first rocket to be developed with such a capability and development of the stage took a mere eight months.

A version of the AJ10 engine used for the Able rocket stage was used as the engine of Apollo Service Module. 
The Able stage name represents its place as the first in the series, from the Joint Army/Navy Phonetic Alphabet.

To save weight Aerojet used an aluminum tube for the engine thrust chamber. The engine used on Vanguard was an AJ10-37. On later Able models rockets the AJ10-41 and AJ10-42 engines were used. Aerojet made 21 Able rocket stages for use on launchers. The Vanguard project launched 11 Able stages.  Three put satellites into orbit: Vanguard 1, Vanguard 2 and Vanguard 3.  The Able rocket stage and the Vanguard project were an important part of the space race between the US and Soviet union. The AJ10 engines used in the Able rocket stage continue to be used on later rockets and are still in use. 
In honor of the rocket stage during an animals in space test, a rhesus monkey name Miss Able, flew with Miss Baker on  May 28, 1959.

Specifications
Loaded gross mass: 
Empty (unfueled) mass 
Thrust 
Specific impulse (vacuum) 
Height: 
Diameter: 
Span: 

Burn time: 115 seconds.

See also
Thor (rocket family)
Thor-Able
Thor-Agena
Thor-Delta
Atlas-Able
Thor-Ablestar
 Multistage rocket
 Three-stage-to-orbit
 Two-stage-to-orbit
 Single-stage-to-orbit

References

Rocket stages